The IMOCA 60 Class yacht Super Bigou designed by Pierre Rolland and launched in the year 2000. What makes the boat rare is that it was constructed by Bernard Stamm the boats original skipper and owner rather than an established yard.

Racing Results

Gallery

Name / Ownership

Super Bigou

BOBST Group - ARMOR LUX

Cheminées POUJOULAT - ARMOR LUX

Cheminées POUJOULAT

We Are Water

Super Bigou, 7 Seas

La Fabrique - SUI 7

Super Bigou

Pip Hare Ocean Racing
In 2018 the boat was chartered by Pip Hare to compete in 2020-2021 Vendée Globe.

Medallia
In 2020 Pip secured title sponsorship for her 2020-2021 Vendée Globe rebranding the boat Medallia.

References 

2000s sailing yachts
Vendée Globe boats
IMOCA 60